The National Albanian American Council (NAAC) is a nonprofit advocacy group based in Washington, DC that represents Albanian Americans and lobbies on their behalf.

Ekrem Bardha co-founded the group on 1 October 1996.

Avni Mustafaj served as its executive director.

References

External links
Official website
Official Facebook

Albania–United States relations
Foreign policy political advocacy groups in the United States
Lobbying organizations in the United States
Organizations based in Washington, D.C.